Anthony Johnson (born January 24, 1993) is a former American football defensive end. He played college football at LSU. During his high school football career at O. Perry Walker High School in New Orleans, Johnson broke the Louisiana career quarterback sack record with 67.5 sacks.

High school career 
Born to Nakisha Johnson and Sherman Patty and raised in New Orleans, Johnson's family was displaced by Hurricane Katrina in 2005, and moved to Atlanta, and later Mobile, Alabama, for a period of time.

After returning to New Orleans, Johnson attended O. Perry Walker High School, where he was a four-time all-district selection. He broke the Louisiana career sack record with 67.5 sacks during his four-year career. As a senior in 2010, he recorded 129 tackles, 31 tackles for loss, and 17.5 sacks. The team went 9–4 on the season, advancing to the LHSAA Class 4A semifinals, where they lost 36–6 to Franklinton. Both USA Today and Parade named Johnson to their All-American teams. Gatorade named him the Louisiana State Player of the Year, as the first lineman, and only third defender, in the 16 years of the award.

One of the most sought after high school players in the country, Johnson was rated as a five-star prospect by every recruiting service. Rivals.com ranked him the No. 1 defensive tackle of his class, and compared him to Darnell Dockett. Johnson chose LSU over offers from almost every major school, including Alabama, Oklahoma, and Southern California.

College career 

Johnson played in thirteen games for LSU in 2011, and was named to both the CBSSports.com and Sporting News Freshman All-American teams. He was named full-time starter in his junior year for the 2013 football season. Johnson declared for the 2014 NFL Draft after his junior season.

Professional career

Miami Dolphins 
On May 10, 2014, Johnson signed with the Miami Dolphins as an undrafted free agent. On December 13, 2014, he was placed on season ending injured reserve after an ankle injury. Johnson did not make the cut for the Dolphins' 2015 season roster.

Washington Redskins 
The Washington Redskins signed Johnson to their practice squad on November 9, 2015.

He signed a futures contract on January 11, 2016. He was released on May 2.

New England Patriots
Johnson signed with the New England Patriots on May 9, 2016. He was released on September 26, 2016. He was signed to the practice squad two days later. He was promoted back to the active roster on October 15, 2016. On October 24, the Patriots waived Johnson. He was re-signed to the practice squad on October 26, 2016.

New York Jets
On November 9, 2016 Johnson was signed by the New York Jets off the Patriots' practice squad.

On August 27, 2017, Johnson was waived/injured by the Jets and placed on injured reserve. He was released on October 17, 2017.

Indianapolis Colts
On November 7, 2017, Johnson was signed to the Indianapolis Colts' practice squad. He was promoted to the active roster on December 5, 2017.

On September 1, 2018, Johnson was placed on injured reserve. He was released on September 11, 2018.

Memphis Express
In 2019, Johnson joined the Memphis Express of the Alliance of American Football. He was placed on injured reserve on March 13, 2019, and activated from injured reserve on April 1, 2019.

Calgary Stampeders
After the AAF ceased operations in April 2019, Johnson signed with the practice roster for the Calgary Stampeders of the Canadian Football League on August 13, 2019. He was released on November 25, 2019.

Los Angeles Wildcats
In October 2019, Johnson was selected by the Los Angeles Wildcats in the 2020 XFL Draft. Johnson was placed on the reserve/left squad list on February 10, 2020. Johnson was reportedly unhappy after the Wildcats fired defensive coordinator Pepper Johnson after their Week 1 loss.

DC Defenders 

On February 14, 2020, Johnson was traded to the DC Defenders in exchange for Bradley Sylve. He had his contract terminated when the league suspended operations on April 10, 2020.

References

External links 
Louisiana State Tigers bio 

1993 births
Living people
Players of American football from New Orleans
American football defensive tackles
LSU Tigers football players
Miami Dolphins players
Washington Redskins players
New England Patriots players
New York Jets players
Indianapolis Colts players
Memphis Express (American football) players
Calgary Stampeders players
Los Angeles Wildcats (XFL) players
DC Defenders players